Helgafell ("holy mountain") is a small mountain on the Snæfellsnes Peninsula of Iceland. A temple in honor of Thor (Þór) was built there by Þórólfr Mostrarskegg, the first settler of the area. 
His biography is described in literary form with fictional and mythical elements in Eyrbyggja saga.

Helgafell also appears in the Laxdæla saga as the location where the heroine Guðrún Ósvífrsdóttir last lived and is supposedly where she is buried.

See also
 Death in Norse paganism

References

Mountains of Iceland
Snæfellsnes

fr:Helgafell
nl:Helgafell